John Livingston "Honus" Craig (November 30, 1881 – April 18, 1942) was an American college football player and coach.

Early years
John Livingston Craig was born on November 30, 1881, in Culleoka, Tennessee, to Thompson Sloan Craig and Ella Cline.

Playing career

Vanderbilt
Craig was a prominent halfback for Dan McGugin's Vanderbilt Commodores football teams which won four SIAA titles. He was also selected All-Southern four times. McGugin once called him the South's greatest athlete and Vanderbilt's greatest halfback. One report says "When Craig was confronted with the above formidable title yesterday by a reporter whose business it is to know such things, he blushed like a girl and tried to show why Dan McGugin's judgment is not always to be trusted."  In Craig's opinion, Bob Blake was the South's greatest player. Craig stood 5 feet 9 inches and weighed 165 pounds. He was nominated though not selected for an Associated Press All-Time Southeast 1920-1969 era team.

1906
Vanderbilt had a major intersection for the first time when it defeated Carlisle in 1906 by a single Bob Blake drop kick, "the crowning feat of the Southern Intercollegiate Athletic Association season." Craig called this his hardest game, giving special praise to Albert Exendine as "the fastest end I ever saw."

1907
Craig went over for the touchdown to beat Sewanee in 1907, after the play which Grantland Rice called the greatest thrill he ever witnessed in his years of watching sports, the double-pass play ending with a pass from Bob Blake to Stein Stone. Earlier in the game Craig caught a 35-yard touchdown pass from Blake.

Coaching career
Craig once coached at the Columbia Military Academy.

Polytechnic College
Craig was coach and athletic director at Texas Wesleyan University (then called Polytechnic College).

Death
Craig died on April 18, 1942, in Maury County, Tennessee, while on a fishing trip. At the time of his death he was safety director for the Tennessee State Highway Department.

References

1881 births
1942 deaths
American football halfbacks
Texas Wesleyan Rams athletic directors
Texas Wesleyan Rams football coaches
Vanderbilt Commodores football players
All-Southern college football players
People from Culleoka, Tennessee
Coaches of American football from Tennessee
Players of American football from Tennessee